V. Thomas Shanahan (February 13, 1925 – March 10, 2014) was an American broadcaster.

Personal life
Born in Milwaukee, Wisconsin, Shanahan attended Hi-Mount School, Steuben Junior High and then Washington High School. He later fought with the United States Army in World War II. He died in Wauwatosa, Wisconsin at age 89.

Broadcasting career
While still in high school, Shanahan began working for WEMP in Milwaukee. After his time in the military, he returned to WEMP and remained there through the 1960s. He broadcast Milwaukee Brewers games alongside Mickey Heath and Earl Gillespie. In 1953, when Major League Baseball arrived in Milwaukee, Shanahan put together the first Milwaukee Braves broadcasting network. He also hosted a pregame show called Dugout Doings. 

He also worked for WRIT-AM, WITI-TV, WCUB-AM, WHBL, WTKM-FM and WTKM, all Wisconsin-based stations. 

In 2003, he was inducted into the Wisconsin Broadcasters Hall of Fame.

References

External links
JSOnline tribute

1925 births
2014 deaths
American broadcasters
United States Army personnel of World War II